West Virginia's 3rd Senate district is one of 17 districts in the West Virginia Senate. It is currently represented by Republicans Donna Boley and Mike Azinger. All districts in the West Virginia Senate elect two members to staggered four-year terms.

Geography
District 3 covers much of the Mid-Ohio Valley region, including all of Pleasants, Wirt, and Wood Counties and parts of Roane County. It is based in the city of Parkersburg, also covering the nearby communities of Vienna, Williamstown, Blennerhassett, Mineralwells, Elizabeth, and St. Marys.

The district is located largely within West Virginia's 1st congressional district, with a small portion extending into West Virginia's 2nd congressional district, and overlaps with the 6th, 7th, 8th, 9th, 10th, and 11th districts of the West Virginia House of Delegates. It borders the state of Ohio.

Recent election results

2022

Historical election results

2020

2018

2016
In 2016, both seats were up for election due to an unusual series of events. Republican Bob Ashley, who had been appointed to the Senate following the departure of David Nohe in 2015, chose to run in a primary against his fellow senator Donna Boley, leaving his own seat open and triggering a special election.

2016 regular

2016 special

2014

2012

Federal and statewide results in District 3

References

3
Pleasants County, West Virginia
Roane County, West Virginia
Wirt County, West Virginia
Wood County, West Virginia